The Australasian College of Sport and Exercise Physicians (ACSEP) is a not-for-profit professional organisation responsible for training, educating, and representing over 350 doctors in Australia and New Zealand. These doctors practise medicine in the specialty of sport and exercise medicine (SEM). The ACSEP is the smallest of the 15 recognised specialist medical Colleges in Australia with approximately 260 Fellows and Registrars in 2020.

Sport and exercise medicine practice in Australia and New Zealand

Sport and exercise medicine is a specialty area of medicine, although the structure of SEM training varies substantially from country to country. In Australia and New Zealand the status of SEM is of a stand-alone specialty with ACSEP being the specialist College administering training and education. In Australia and New Zealand, patients are encouraged or required to visit a General Practitioner before being referred to a specialist. Doctors wishing to specialize in sport and exercise medicine must complete a medical degree, a minimum of three years of pre-specialty general medical training, a minimum of 4 years of specialty (advanced) training with the ACSEP, pass examinations, publish a research paper in the field of SEM and undertake annual continuous medical education to stay active. The ACSEP is one of the few specialist medical colleges in Australia and NZ that conducts training in primarily in private practice, others being the Royal Australian College of General Practitioners and Australian College of Rural and Remote Medicine.

Although sports physicians can prescribe drugs, perform minor surgical procedures, use Diagnostic ultrasound and order other radiological imaging and blood tests, the signature treatment of SEM practice is exercise prescription. 
Careers within SEM  in Australia and NZ include:

 Clinical sports medicine practice, treating musculoskeletal injuries in athletes, but also treating illness and working in areas such as sports cardiology, managing concussion and exercise-induced asthma
 Clinical exercise medicine practice assisting with non-athletic patients who are trying to exercise move for general health. Exercise is known to treat and/or prevent cancer, cardiovascular disease, mental health disorders, arthritis and back pain, diabetes and osteoporosis, which are many of Australia's health priorities.
 Working in professional and elite sport as a team doctor 
 Working in professional and elite sport as an administrator. The majority of major sports in Australia have Chief Medical Officers  who oversee medical and health policy within the sport
 Working in research/academic publication 

Some of the major conditions typically treated by SEM include Osteoarthritis, Tendinopathy, Back pain, Muscle strain, Concussions in sport, Sprained ankle, Anterior cruciate ligament injury, Dislocated shoulder.

Sports and exercise medicine physicians working in specialist SEM practice and the ACSEP are differentiated from the more broad bodies Sports Medicine Australia and Sports Medicine New Zealand which represents not only doctors but also Allied Health practitioners working in the Sports medicine field, including occupations such as Physiotherapist, Exercise Physiologist, Podiatrist and other branches of Sports science. The worldwide parent body for these more broad sports medicine associations is FIMS.

Funding

Sport and exercise medicine in New Zealand is essentially funded by the Accident Compensation Corporation, which is a no-fault government insurer covering all injuries which occur in NZ, including sports injuries. Professional sports also directly employ some SEM physicians.

In Australia, limited funding is provided by Medicare for patients of SEM physicians. However, Medicare rebates for SEM physicians were lowered in 2010, and have not subsequently been increased, so that much of the expense in consulting a SEM physician is borne by the patient. Initial referred consultations with a SEM specialist under Medicare in Australia had a bulk-billing rate of only 9% in 2018–19, which is the lowest for any type of specialist under Medicare in Australia. A typical cost for consultation was A$225 in 2018–19, of which only $73.85 was refunded by Medicare, leaving patients $151 out of pocket. A recent review of Medicare has recommended that SEM consultation rebates for SEM physicians increase to achieve parity with other specialist physicians  (p 29-37), although no response to this review has been made yet by the Department of Health.

History

The ACSEP was originally formed as the Australian College of Sports Physicians (ACSP) in 1985 by a group of doctors with vocational interest in sports medicine. Some of the original sports physicians in Australia were GPs who took an interest in sport and eventually chose to practise full-time in this area. In the late 1980s, a decision was made to pursue a stand-alone medical specialty with a formal structure of entry and Fellowship exams and multi-year training program. The ACSP granted honorary Fellowship (FACSP) to ten Fellows of other recognized specialty colleges in Australia  who acted as examiners. All applicants for the inaugural FACSP qualification had to show the equivalent of current practice in sports medicine and pass an exam, which first took place in 1991. This examination continued to become the Part 2 ACSP examination.

In 1992, the first registrars (trainees) were admitted onto the ACSP training program, which was conducted in private practice initially in Melbourne and Sydney. The ACSP first part examination was developed.

In 1993, the first training position at a government institution was created at the Australian Institute of Sport (AIS) in Canberra.

In 1993 New Zealand Fellows were admitted for the first time.

In 1998, sports medicine was recognized as a vocational specialty in New Zealand.

In 2000, ACSEP Fellows were instrumental in providing athlete care services for all sports in the Sydney Olympic Games. The training program was well established with 17 training posts in the year 2000.

In 2000, sports physicians were first recognized by Medicare in Australia and awarded consultation item numbers equivalent to vocationally-registered General Practitioners.

In 2006, the Faculty of Sport and Exercise Medicine UK was established with many of the structures and training programs established using the existing structures of the ACSP.

In 2008, the ACSP was successfully assessed by the Australian Medical Council as having fulfilled all the criteria for establishment as a specialist medical College in Australia. This has been successfully reviewed in 2013 and 2019.

In 2010, Medicare recognized sports physicians as specialists in Australia.

In 2014, the National Office, which was initially established in Sydney, moved to Collins St in the Melbourne CBD.

In 2016, the ACSP changed its name to include Exercise in the title alongside sport with the College abbreviation becoming ACSEP. Exercise medicine is thought to be an emerging branch of SEM aimed at keeping the population healthy by assisting with Exercise Prescription.

By 2020, the ACSEP had over 50 training positions (registrars) with over 200 specialist doctors in total in Australia and New Zealand, and other affiliated members.

In 2020, New Zealand Sport & Exercise Physicians published a consensus statement in response to the Coronavirus pandemic. A similar statement was published in Australia by the Australian Institute of Sport.

Notable Sports Physicians in Australasia

Notable 
sports physicians in Australia and New Zealand (who are ACSEP Fellows) include Peter Larkins, Nathan Gibbs, Rachel Harris, Martin Raftery, Peter Fricker, Karim M. Khan, Lesley Rumball and Dave Gerrard. Dr Geoff Thompson was named the Northern Territory Australian of the Year in 2020. The majority of the doctors working for AFL clubs are sport and exercise physicians.

Office bearers
The key office bearers at the ACSEP are:

Sport and exercise medicine physicians are generally appointed as the Chief Medical Officers for most of the major sporting competitions in Australian and New Zealand. Current sport CMOs are:

Sport and Exercise Medicine Physicians constituted the majority of panel members for the Australian government COVID-19 Sports and Health Advisory Committee (C19SHAC), reporting to the Australian Health Protection Principal Committee as part of response to the Coronavirus pandemic in Australia.

Controversies in Australasian sports medicine

Sports medicine is one of the most visible medical specialties in Australia and New Zealand because of the prominence of professional sport in these countries. Issues that have had very high public profile that have involved sports medicine include Concussions in Australian sport, the Impact of the COVID-19 pandemic on sports, the Essendon Football Club supplements saga, Cronulla-Sutherland Sharks supplements saga, Drugs in sport in Australia, and serious injuries to high-profile players, such as Phillip Hughes (who died playing cricket in Australia). A criticism/controversy of doctors who work in professional sport is that generally they are paid by their team which creates a potential conflict of interest between the best interests of the team and the best interests of the long-term health of the player (patient). The management of on-field concussion is a particular area of controversy, with club doctors given both responsibility for player safety and accountability. Individual doctors working in professional and elite sport have been publicly criticised or accused of helping clubs cover up drug use or poor behaviour of players  or engaging in such behaviour themselves. It is not known whether the professional sport environment is associated with a higher rate of poor medical practice or whether the high public profile of sport leads to accusations being publicly made far more often in Sports Medicine than in other fields.

Within clinical practice of Sport and Exercise Medicine in Australia, there is a criticism that some of these specialists are overly willing to use or recommend speculative new treatments such as Stem Cell injections. The ACSEP has a position statement exercising caution over the use of Stem Cells but does not forbid individual members from doing so.

There is also criticism of SEM physicians in Australia that they undertake too much surgical assisting, as this is generously funded under Medicare in Australia. A recent Medicare review report however still found that the majority of Medicare billing for sport and exercise Medicine physicians was through consultations, not procedures.

Partners

 National Rugby League to create the Dr Ken Crichton Fellowship 
 Accident Compensation Corporation to work to reduce injuries in New Zealand.
 University of Washington's Center for Sports Cardiology to produce a module for training physicians in the interpretation of Electrocardiography in Athletes.
 Australia's National Osteoarthritis Strategy.
 Australian Institute of Sport, the Australian Medical Association and Sports Medicine Australia in the Concussion in Sport Australia Position statement.

Journals

The ACSEP subscribes to many sport and exercise medicine journals but has a particular relationship as a member society with the Clinical Journal of Sport Medicine and the British Journal of Sports Medicine.

See also
 Australian Institute of Sport
 Accident Compensation Corporation
 Sports Medicine Australia
 Canadian Academy of Sport and Exercise Medicine
 FIMS
 British Association of Sport and Exercise Medicine
 Exercise is Medicine
New Zealand College of Musculoskeletal Medicine

References

External links

sports physicians in Australia
Learned societies of Australia
Learned societies of New Zealand
Medical associations based in Australia
Medical associations based in New Zealand
Medical education in Australia
1985 establishments in Australia
Sports medicine
New Zealand sports physicians
Medical and health organisations based in Australia
Specialist medical colleges in Australia
Sports medicine organizations
Medical and health organisations based in Victoria (Australia)